Yazeed Matthews (born 22 April 1996) is a South African soccer player who plays for Detroit City in the USL Championship.

Career

College & Amateur
Matthews began playing college soccer in the United States at Tyler Junior College, where he went on to score 36 goals and tally 12 assists in 45 appearances. He was named the NJCAA National Player of the Year following the 2016 season, and led Tyler to the 2016 National Junior College Championship after finishing as the runners up in 2015. In 2017, he transferred to Coastal Carolina University, where he netted 16 times in 30 appearances for the Chanticleers.

Following college, Matthews signed with National Premier Soccer League side AFC Ann Arbor, scoring five goals in 11 regular season games. After his 2019 season, he signed with Detroit City in the National Independent Soccer Association.

Professional
On 13 August 2022, Matthews returned to Detroit City halfway during their USL Championship season.

References

1996 births
Living people
AFC Ann Arbor players
Association football forwards
Coastal Carolina Chanticleers men's soccer players
Detroit City FC players
Expatriate soccer players in the United States
National Independent Soccer Association players
National Premier Soccer League players
South African soccer players
South African expatriate soccer players
South African expatriate sportspeople in the United States
USL Championship players
Tyler Apaches men's soccer players